HMS Pelorus is the designation which has been given to numerous ships of the Royal Navy.

  was an 18-gun  launched in 1808 and wrecked in 1844 while transporting opium to China.
  was a 22-gun  wooden screw corvette launched in 1857 and broken up for scrap in 1869.
 , a  light cruiser launched in 1889 and renamed HMS Mildura in 1890.  She served on the Australia Station and was sold for scrap in 1906.
 , a  protected cruiser launched in 1896 and sold for scrap in 1920.
 , an  launched in 1943.  She was sold to South Africa in 1947, becoming HMSAS Pietermaritzburg. She was scuttled on 12 November 1994 to make an artificial reef at Miller's Point near Simon's Town, South Africa.

Royal Navy ship names